The Thornbridge Brewery is an independent brewery founded in the grounds of Thornbridge Hall in Ashford-in-the-Water near Bakewell, Derbyshire, England.

History
The first Thornbridge craft beers were produced in February 2005 in a 10-barrel brewery, housed in the grounds of Thornbridge Hall.

A new state of the art 30-barrel brewery at Bakewell was opened in September 2009 with an aim to continue to brew high quality cask, keg and bottled beers and develop new ones through innovation in process and usage of the finest natural ingredients. The original Hall Brewery continues to operate in developing new, seasonal and speciality beers.

Thornbridge has won more than 350 awards since its opening, including the Gold Medal (Best Black IPA in the World) at the World Beer Awards 2012 and 2013 for Wild Raven, Gold Medal (Best Kölsch in the World) at the World Beer Awards 2013 and 2015 for Tzara, Silver Medal (strong ales) at the Great British Beer Festival in August 2006) for Jaipur IPA - named also as one of The Top 50 Food and Drinks in Britain. In May 2014, Thornbridge was recognised as the Best Drinks Producer in the BBC Radio 4 Food and Farming Awards 2014. It has also won awards at the World Beer Cup: 2010 Silver Bracia, 2012 Bronze Raven and 2014 Silver Wild Swan. It also won the 2015 Beer Marketing Awards for Best Use of Competitions.

The brewery has been called the first UK craft brewery and its beers are now distributed in over 30 countries.

The brewery celebrated 10 years of brewing in 2015 with the launch of Jaipur X – a 10% version of its multi-award winning Jaipur IPA (5.9%) (Britain Best Beer 2013, National SIBA Awards 2012, GBBF Champion Keg Ale Award 2011 and Great Taste Awards - are a few examples).

Core cask beers
Brother Rabbit (4% ABV) - golden ale
Jaipur (5.9% ABV) - India pale ale
Kipling (5.2% ABV) - South Pacific pale ale
Lord Marples (4% ABV) - best bitter
Wild Swan (3.5% ABV) - white gold pale ale

Core keg beers
 AM.PM (4.5% ABV) - all day IPA
Chiron (5% ABV) - American pale ale
Colorado Red (5.9% ABV) - English hopped red ale
Halcyon (7.4% ABV) - Imperial IPA
Jaipur (5.9% ABV) - IPA
Jamestown (5.9% ABV) - New England India pale ale
Wild Raven (6.6% ABV) - black IPA

Core bottled beers
 AM.PM (4.5% ABV) - all day IPA
 Bracia (10% ABV) - rich dark ale
 Chiron (5% ABV) - American pale ale
 Cocoa Wonderland (6.8% ABV) - chocolate porter
 Colorado Red (5.9% ABV) - English hopped red ale
 Jaipur (5.9% ABV) - IPA
 Halcyon (7.4% ABV) - Imperial IPA 
 Twin Peaks (5% ABV) - Anglo American pale ale 
 Tzara (4.8% ABV) - Kölsch
 Wild Raven (6.6% ABV) - black IPA
 Wild Swan (3.5% ABV) - white gold pale ale

External links
 Thornbridge Brewery website
 RateBeer.com

References

Companies based in Derbyshire
Food and drink companies established in 2005
Breweries in England
British companies established in 2005
2005 establishments in England